Kechery  is a town in Thrissur district , Kerala, India. It is 16 kilometers away from Thrissur and 7 kilometers from Kunnamkulam. One of the important hindu pilgrim center Guruvayur temple is 11 kilometres away from here.

History
Kechery is a place which has its own multifaceted culture and heritage. You can find a mosaic of different cultures, religious and lineages. Kechery is on the bank of the river Kechery Puzha, which is named after the village. There is an old areca nut market known throughout the country. Kechery is renowned for its contributions to world in fields as diverse as football to literature to films.

Kechery is an important business centre in Choondal Grama Panchayath, Thrissur District, Kerala, India. This place is host to numerous political, social and cultural activities. Sri. K.P. Aravindakshan, former M.P. (Rajyasabha) and chief whip of Kerala, Yousafali Kechery a famous poet, film lyricist, film producer and director of Kerala and former President of Sahitya Academy. Dr. Radhakrishna Kaimal, Sri. P.T. Lazar Master, Sri. E.P. Bharatha Pisharodi, Dr. K.K. Rajan, Sri. C.L. Porinchukutty,Muhammed Fasal R.K, are some of the important personalities in these fields.

Geography
The river Kechery, named after the village, begins in the Machad forest range which is about 6000 feet above sea level and flows through different areas. Eranellur, Chiranellur, Parannur and Choondal are situated on both sides of Kechery river. One important project in the river is Parannur chira (പാറന്നൂർ ചിറ), it serves irrigation purposes of the villages around it. Nowadays Parannur Chira is getting more popular for tourism and film shooting. Kechery is surrounded with Perumala hill (East), Choondal hill (South), Choondal rock (West), Pattikara backwater and Parappur backwater (North).

Celebrations
The place is well known for celebrations. Kechery Parappookkavu temple festival is the most famous and colorful event because of number of elephants and festival related myths and beliefs.

Notable Personalities 
 Yusufali Kechery – National Award winning Film lyricist, Poet, Film producer and Director
 Irshad Ali – Malayalam film actor
 Shri. K.P. Aravindakshan – Government Chief Whip in 8th Kerala Legislative Assembly and Parliamentary Member in Rajya Sabha (1967-68)
 Dr.Radhakrishna Kaimal – Former Dean, College of Veterinary and Animal Sciences, Mannuthy
 Shri. C.L. Porinchukutty – Artist and Former Principal of College of Fine Arts Trivandrum

References 

Cities and towns in Thrissur district